So Fresh: The Hits of Spring 2008 is a compilation of twenty tracks by various artists which were popular on the ARIA Charts of Australia in mid-2008 and is part of the ongoing So Fresh series. Besides the audio disc, it included a DVD containing music videos for ten tracks, and was released on 13 September 2008.

Track listing

Disc 1
Metro Station – "Shake It" (3:00)
Sam Sparro – "Black and Gold" (3:32)
Rihanna – "Disturbia" (3:58)
Chris Brown – "Forever" (4:37)
Ne-Yo – "Closer" (3:56)
Jordin Sparks – "One Step at a Time" (3:26)
The Potbelleez – "Are You with Me" (3:42)
MGMT – "Electric Feel" (3:49)
The Ting Tings – "That's Not My Name" (5:10)
The Living End – "White Noise" (3:44)
Brian McFadden – "Twisted" (3:38)
Ladyhawke – "Paris Is Burning" (3:49)
Vanessa Amorosi – "The Simple Things (Something Emotional)" (3:36)
Pete Murray – "Saving Grace" (2:58)
Nelly featuring Fergie – "Party People" (4:04)
Usher – "Moving Mountains" (5:00)
Alicia Keys – "Superwoman" (4:35)
Kelly Rowland featuring Travie McCoy – "Daylight" (3:31)
Delta Goodrem – "I Can't Break It to My Heart" (4:01)
Lady Gaga featuring Colby O'Donis – "Just Dance" (Trevor Simpson Edit) (3:40)

Disc 2 (DVD)
Metro Station – "Shake It"
Sam Sparro – "Black and Gold"
Rihanna – "Disturbia"
Chris Brown – " Forever"
Jordin Sparks – "One Step at a Time"
The Potbelleez – "Are You with Me"
MGMT – "Electric Feel"
Brian McFadden – "Twisted"
Vanessa Amorosi – "The Simple Things (Something Emotional)"
Pete Murray – "Saving Grace"
Nelly featuring Fergie – "Party People"
Alicia Keys – "Superwoman"

Charts

Certifications

References

So Fresh albums
2008 compilation albums
2008 video albums
Music video compilation albums
2008 in Australian music